Impar may refer to:

IMPAR, a Cape Verdean insurance company
Azygos (disambiguation), a synonym for impar, an anatomical word for unpaired

See also
Ganglion impar